, also known as , is a Japanese illustrator and character designer. He is from the Kanagawa Prefecture and lives in the Fukuoka Prefecture. He is probably best known for his frequent collaborations with writer Keiichi Sigsawa as the illustrator/character designer for the Kino's Journey, Sword Art Online Alternative Gun Gale Online and Tale of a Single Continent series as well as with several other authors and game developers.

Works

Illustration 
Tale of a Single Continent series
Allison
Lillia and Treize
Meg and Seron
Aquarian Age Novel
Cosmos no Sora ni Drama CD 
Danshi Kōkōsei de Urekko Light Novel Sakka o Shiteiru Keredo, Toshishita no Classmate de Seiyū no Onnanoko ni Kubi o Shimerareteiru.
Heisa no System
Hokago Taima Roku
Kino's Journey
Gakuen Kino
Ocha ga Hakobarete Kuru Made ni 〜A Book At Cafe〜 (January 2010)
Yoru ga Hakobarete Kuru Made ni 〜A Book in A Bed〜 (December 2010)
Album cover and booklet for Yoru ga Hakobarete Kuru Made ni 〜A Song in A Bed〜 by angela (January 2011)
Sword Art Online Alternative Gun Gale Online

Character design 
Fate/Grand Order (Original Character Design for Katsushika Hokusai, Abigail Williams, Yang Guifei and Jacques de Molay)
22/7 (Original Character Design for Mikami Kamiki)
One Off
Princess Principal
Sacred Blaze
Shigofumi: Letters from the Departed
Sky Girls 
Summon Night series
World Conquest Zvezda Plot
Hololive English (Original Character Design for Ninomae Ina'nis)
Azur Lane (Original Character Design for Shimakaze)

Artbooks 
Kuroboshi Kouhaku, The Beautiful World (March 2003)
Coadventure (December 2005)
Kuroboshi Kouhaku Gashu noir (April 2015)
Kuroboshi Kouhaku Gashu blanc (January 2021)

See also 
Keiichi Sigsawa

References

External links
 GRANADA LEVEL9 (Kouhaku Kuroboshi's blog)
 

1974 births
Living people
Japanese illustrators